Discography of Christian Death, all three versions: 1) originally fronted by Rozz Williams, 2) fronted by Valor Kand, 3) parallel version formed by Rozz Williams in the late 1980s.

Fronted by Rozz Williams

Albums 

 Only Theatre of Pain (1982)
 Catastrophe Ballet (1984)
 Ashes (1985)

EPs 

 Deathwish (1984) (recorded 1981)

Live albums 

 Catastrophe Ballet Live (1989)
 The Decomposition of Violets (1985)
 Iconologia (1993)
 The Doll's Theatre (1994) (recorded 1981)

Other 

 Singles + Demos (1979)

Compilation albums 

 Invocations 1981–1989 (live and studio archival recordings) (1993)

Fronted by Valor Kand

Albums 

 Atrocities (1986)
 The Scriptures (1987)
 Sex and Drugs and Jesus Christ (1988)
 All the Love All the Hate (Part 1 – All the Love) (1989)
 All the Love All the Hate (Part 2 – All the Hate) (1989)
 Insanus, Ultio, Proditio, Misericordiaque (1990)
 Sexy Death God (1994)
 Prophecies (1996)
 Pornographic Messiah (1998)
 Born Again Anti Christian (2000)
 American Inquisition (2007)
 The Root OF ALL Evilution (2015)

EPs 

 The Wind Kissed Pictures (1985)

Live albums 

 Jesus Christ Proudly Presents (1987)
 The Heretics Alive (1989)
 Amen (1995)

Compilation albums 

 Anthology of Live Bootlegs Vol. 1 (1988)
 Anthology of Live Bootlegs Vol. 2 (1989)
 Past Present and Forever (1988) (re-release of The Wind Kissed Pictures)
 Jesus Points the Bone at You? (1991)
 The Bible (1999)
 Love and Hate (2001)

Singles 

 "Believers of the Unpure" (1986)
 "Sick of Love" (1987)
 "Church of No Return" (1988)
 "What's the Verdict" (1988)
 "Zero Sex" (1989)
 "We Fall Like Love"/"I Hate You" (1989)

Christian Death II (also known as Christian Death featuring Rozz Williams)

Albums 

 The Iron Mask (1992)
 The Path of Sorrows (1993)
 The Rage of Angels (1994)

Live albums 

 Heavens and Hells (1990)
 Sleepless Nights: Live 1990 (1993)
 Christian Death: Live (video; 1995)
 Death in Detroit (1995)

Compilation albums 

 Mandylion (released solely in Europe under the name Christ Death) (1993)
 Death Mix (1996)
 The Best of Christian Death (Featuring: Rozz Williams) (1999)
 Death Club 1981–1993 (2005)
 Six Six Sixth Communion (2007)
 Death Box (box-set; 2012)

Singles 

 "Skeleton Kiss" (1992)
 "Spiritual Cramp" (split with Sex Gang Children) (1992)

References

External links 

 
 

Discographies of American artists